The Porch Fields is an area of medieval farmland outside Trim, Ireland with a medieval roadway that forms a National Monument.

Location

The Porch Fields are a green area in Trim, located on the north bank of the River Boyne, between the old town wall and Sheep Gate to the west and Newtown Abbey to the east.

History

The Porchfield lies between the Anglo‐Norman town of Trim founded c. 1180 and the rural borough of Newtown Trim founded c. 1220. The two towns were connected through the open field via a medieval sunken lane road about 1 km (⅔ mile) in length. The new burgesses were awarded  of land each. They used ridge and furrow agriculture to grow crops, and each narrow strip was one perch (5 m / 16½ feet) wide — this may is how the Porch Fields acquired their name. However, it could also derive from the French porte meaning "door", referring to the Sheep Gate. The name " Portual Field" appears on a nineteenth-century map.

It is claimed that Oliver Cromwell's troops made camp on the Porch Fields before the 1649 Siege of Drogheda.

References

National Monuments in County Meath
Trim, County Meath